Márcio Silva (born 2 July 1980) is a Brazilian bobsledder. He competed in the four man event at the 2006 Winter Olympics.

References

External links
 

1980 births
Living people
Brazilian male bobsledders
Olympic bobsledders of Brazil
Bobsledders at the 2006 Winter Olympics
Sportspeople from São Paulo